POSM may refer to:

 Point-of-sale materials, advertising materials in retail shops attracting customers to specific products; see Point of sale display
 Police Overseas Service Medal, an award in the Australian honours system.
 Propylene Oxide / Styrene Monomer, a chemical process of manufacturing propylene and styrene; see Styrene#From ethylbenzene